Gia is a 1998 American biographical drama television film about the life and times of one of the first supermodels, Gia Carangi. The film stars Angelina Jolie as Gia and Faye Dunaway as Wilhelmina Cooper, with Mercedes Ruehl and Elizabeth Mitchell. It was directed by Michael Cristofer and written by Cristofer and Jay McInerney. The original music score was composed by Terence Blanchard.

Plot
Gia Carangi is a Philadelphia native who moves to New York City to become a fashion model, and immediately catches the attention of powerful agent Wilhelmina Cooper. Gia's attitude and beauty help her rise quickly to the forefront of the modeling industry, but her persistent loneliness, especially after the death of Wilhelmina, drives her to use mood-altering drugs such as cocaine and heroin.

She becomes entangled in a passionate affair with Linda, a make-up artist. Their love affair first starts when both pose nude for a photo shoot and make love afterward. Gia tries to get clean and begins taking methadone. However, Gia eventually starts using again, and Linda gives her an ultimatum. Gia chooses the drugs.

Failed attempts at reconciliation with Linda and with her mother, Kathleen, drive Gia back to heroin. Although she is eventually able to break her drug habit after much effort, she has already contracted HIV from intravenous drug use, which has progressed to AIDS. She spends the remainder of her life in the hospital.

Cast

Reception

Critical reception
Gia was generally well received by critics, with an approval rating of 92% based on reviews from 13 critics on review aggregator Rotten Tomatoes. Kalamazoo Gazette commented: "Jolie gives it her all in a thoroughly uninhibited and highly effective portrait of a woman living from thrill to thrill." Christopher Null of Filmcritic.com gave the film 3 out of 5 stars. Conversely, Film Freak Central gave the film only 1.5 out of 4 stars and commented: "Gia isn't hagiography, I'll give it that, but it is reductive to a fault."

Awards
Golden Globes
 Angelina Jolie – Best Performance by an Actress in a Mini-Series or Motion Picture Made for Television
 Faye Dunaway – Best Performance by an Actress in a Supporting Role in a Series, Mini-Series or Motion Picture

Emmy Awards
 Eric A. Sears – Outstanding Single Camera Picture Editing for a Miniseries or a Movie

Screen Actors Guild Awards
 Angelina Jolie – Outstanding Performance by a Female Actor in a Television Movie or Miniseries

References

External links
 
 
 

1998 television films
1998 films
1998 in American television
1998 drama films
1998 LGBT-related films
1990s biographical drama films
1990s English-language films
American biographical drama films
American LGBT-related television films
American mockumentary films
Biographical films about models
Biographical television films
Borderline personality disorder in fiction
American drama television films
Female bisexuality in film
Films about heroin addiction
Films directed by Michael Cristofer
Films scored by Terence Blanchard
Films set in the 1970s
Films set in the 1980s
Films set in New York City
Films set in Philadelphia
Films shot in Los Angeles
Films shot in New York City
Films with screenplays by Michael Cristofer
HBO Films films
HIV/AIDS in American films
HIV/AIDS in television
Lesbian-related films
LGBT-related drama films
LGBT-related films based on actual events
1990s American films